Three Easy Pieces may refer to:
 Three Easy Pieces (album), an album by Buffalo Tom
 Three Easy Pieces (Stravinsky), a composition by Igor Stravinsky